Skårup is a town located on the island of Funen in south-central Denmark in Svendborg Municipality close to the city of Svendborg.

Seminarium 

Skårup was previously the location of Skårup Seminarium which closed in 2010. The buildings are still there, although a new use for them has yet to be determined.

Notable people 
 Emil Rostrup (1831–1907) a Danish botanist, mycologist and plant pathologist and, for 25 years from 1858, a teacher at the paedagogical college Skårup Seminarium in then new subject of natural history
 Hans Peter Nielsen (1852 in Vejstrup near Skårup – 1928) a Danish farmer and politician

References 

Cities and towns in the Region of Southern Denmark
Svendborg Municipality